Mossa is a comune (municipality) in the Italian region Friuli-Venezia Giulia, located about  northwest of Trieste and about  west of Gorizia.

The name is derived from the old German "Moos Au".

Mossa borders the following municipalities: Capriva del Friuli, Farra d'Isonzo, Gorizia, San Floriano del Collio, San Lorenzo Isontino.

References

Cities and towns in Friuli-Venezia Giulia